Daniel Goumou (born 10 April 1990) is a Qatari-born Guinean footballer. A midfielder, he currently plays for Al-Markhiya.

Career
Goumou began his career with Falcon College, before moving to the ASPIRE Academy for Sports Excellence in 2006.  Aged 18, he left Conakry for Morocco. After just 3 months he moved to Qatar in 2008. In February 2009, he joined Al Rayyan.
In the 2011–12 season of the Qatar Stars League, Goma racked up a record number of yellow cards since the beginning of the league, with 7 yellow cards in 9 appearances.

International career
Goumou has played for the Qatar Olympic football team in the 2010 Asian Games in China.

Honours
Emir of Qatar Cup
Winner (1): 2011 with Al Rayyan SC.

References

External links
 QSL.com.qa profile

1990 births
Living people
Guinean footballers
Qatari footballers
Al-Rayyan SC players
Al-Sailiya SC players
Al Kharaitiyat SC players
Al-Markhiya SC players
Sportspeople from Conakry
Naturalised citizens of Qatar
Guinean emigrants to Qatar
Qatar Stars League players
Qatari Second Division players
Footballers at the 2010 Asian Games
Qatari people of Guinean descent
Aspire Academy (Qatar) players
Association football midfielders
Asian Games competitors for Qatar